Waylon Brown (born July 13, 1979) is the Iowa State Senator from the 30th District. A Republican, he has served in the Iowa Senate since defeating incumbent Mary Jo Wilhelm in 2016. Brown is a farmer and a small businessman who owns a construction company, also serving as the Vice President of the Mitchell County, Iowa Farm Bureau Board. He currently resides in St. Ansgar, Iowa, with his wife Julie and two children.

As of February 2020, Brown serves on the following committees: Transportation (Vice Chair), Agriculture, Commerce, Labor and Business Relations, and Ways and Means. He also serves on the Studies Committee, as well as the Administrative Rules Review Committee (Vice Chair), Fuel Distribution Percentage Formula Review Committee, State Government Efficiency Review Committee, Nonresident Deer Hunting License Committee, Nonresident Wild Turkey Hunting License Committee, and the Statewide Fire and Police Retirement System Board of Trustees.

Electoral history

References  

Living people
1979 births
Republican Party Iowa state senators
21st-century American politicians